Docklands Stadium, also currently known by naming rights sponsorship as Marvel Stadium, is a multi-purpose sports and entertainment stadium in the Docklands area of Melbourne, Victoria, Australia. Construction started in October 1997 and was completed in 2000 at a cost of A$460 million. The stadium features a retractable roof and the ground level seating can be converted from oval to rectangular configuration.

The stadium is primarily used for Australian rules football and was originally built as a replacement for Waverley Park. Offices at the precinct serve as the headquarters of the Australian Football League (AFL) which, since 7 October 2016, has had exclusive ownership of the venue. With a capacity for 53,000 spectators for sports, the stadium is the second-largest in Melbourne and has hosted a number of other sporting events—including domestic Twenty20 cricket matches, Melbourne Victory soccer home matches, rugby league and rugby union matches—as well as special events and concerts. The precinct is also headquarters for the Seven Network's digital broadcast centre and National Australia Bank.

History

Construction

The stadium was announced on 31 October 1996 as a more centrally located replacement for the much larger but ageing Waverley Park as a headquarters for the Australian Football League. It was built in the Melbourne Docklands to the immediate west of the CBD, a central but largely deserted industrial area which had just commenced its own urban renewal project. Construction of the stadium by Baulderstone Hornibrook commenced in October 1997 under the working name "Victoria Stadium", and was completed ahead of the 2000 AFL season. The stadium was originally developed by the Docklands Stadium Consortium and thereafter controlled by the Seven Network, the remaining leasehold interest in the stadium was sold to James Fielding Funds Management on 21 June 2006 for A$330 million.

The stadium, like Waverley Park, was built primarily for Australian rules football, unlike most grounds of a similar size in Australia which were originally designed for cricket then later developed for football. It was the first Australian rules football stadium built with a retractable roof, which throughout its history has usually been closed for night matches and for wet weather day matches, and sometimes also for dry weather day matches. It was also the first stadium in Australia to have movable seating, as all four level-one tiers of the stadium can be moved up to 18 metres forward into a rectangular configuration; despite this being a key feature of the stadium design, it has rarely been used, due to damage to turf, time to deploy the seats, and a reduced capacity since the corner bays of the stadium become unavailable in rectangular configuration.

Development
Construction was finished only weeks before the first match, and some scheduled pre-season matches were relocated as a result. Essendon won the match by 94 points, and Michael Long kicked the first goal at the ground. The game was to have been played under the closed roof, but due to technical issues it remained open. Six days later, Barbra Streisand staged the venue's first concert. The stadium's third football game, between Western Bulldogs and Brisbane Lions on 19 March, was the first to be played under the roof. On 16 August 2000, the world's first indoor One Day International was held at the venue between Australia and South Africa. The first game played in the rectangular configuration was a Melbourne Storm game in July 2001. The first Soccer match played was in Round 5 2001 of the National Soccer League between South Melbourne FC and Melbourne Knights FC.

 
From the beginning, the stadium's playing surface was criticised for its slipperiness, hardness and lack of grass coverage, and the increased risk of injury that this causes to players. Maintaining surface quality remains one of the stadium's biggest challenges. The stadium's orientation and highly built up grandstands mean that the Northern end of the stadium in particular receives only receives 6 weeks of sunlight a year; concerts held at the stadium are also usually placed at the Southern end due to the ability for grass to recover more quickly. The entire surface undergoes regular, expensive replacement during the season with turf grown externally, under contract by HG Turf, whereas the responsibility of laying and managing the turf lies with Docklands Stadium management. Since 2007, elaborate heating and lighting to better allow grass to be grown and managed within the stadium have been in use.

The venue was damaged by a thunderstorm on the afternoon of 6 March 2010 during the 2010 Victorian storms. The external roof at Gate 2 caved in, causing damage and flooding inside the entertainment area.

In 2015, LED electronic advertising was added around the perimeter of the ground on level 1 and 2, as well as a strip synthetic turf around the edge of the fence, outside the boundary line. The synthetic strip was narrowed after Brisbane Lions player Michael Close suffered a season ending ACL injury on the uneven surface during a game in 2015.

Those three clubs all received compensation payments from the AFL to balance the weak deals, and sold occasional home matches to small interstate or international venues for greater financial returns than they could earn at Docklands.

The stadium and broader precinct will undergo a $225 million redevelopment, funded by the AFL and Victorian Government, to be constructed between 2021 and 2024. This included two new video screens, which hang underneath the stadium's roof and were installed behind the goal at each end of the stadium ahead of the 2022 AFL season. The rest of the redevelopment will upgrade stadium infrastructure, connect the precinct to the Melbourne CBD and open up access to the Docklands waterfront.

Ownership
Under the terms of the agreement governing construction and operation of the venue, in 2025 the AFL was to win ownership of the stadium for a nominal $30 fee; but the AFL Commission opted to purchase exclusive ownership of the stadium earlier than this, in October 2016, for approximately $200 million. This purchase left the stadium's tenant AFL clubs millions of dollars better off, as they and the AFL arranged more favourable tenancy agreements. The stadium was eventually integrated into the AFL structure several years later, ending the independent management of the venue by Melbourne Stadiums Limited.

The purchase also soon proved critically important to the AFL's finances during the COVID-19 pandemic, when it was able to leverage its ownership of the stadium in obtaining a $500–600 million line of credit to cover cash flow shortages when the 2020 AFL season was suspended.

Naming rights history

The stadium has never operated under the name 'Docklands Stadium', having been covered by naming rights deals throughout its entire operating history. When it opened, the Colonial State Bank paid $32.5 million for 10 years of naming rights, and the stadium opened as Colonial Stadium; the same year, Commonwealth Bank took over the Colonial State Bank and began to discontinue the brand; Commonwealth then sold the balance of the naming rights contract to Telstra for about $50 million, and the stadium's name was changed to Telstra Dome on 1 October 2002.

On 1 March 2009, the naming rights transferred to Etihad Airways, and the venue became known as Etihad Stadium under a five-year deal, which was later extended to ten years, at a cost estimated at between $5–$8 million per year. This once again caused problems, as the AFL would not initially recognise the new name due to its deal with rival airline Qantas; the league recognised the new name only after further negotiation between the two parties.

In September 2018, the stadium was renamed Marvel Stadium after the stadium operators negotiated an eight-year deal with the Walt Disney Company (the parent company of Marvel Entertainment) to change the naming rights and install a Marvel retail store at the venue.

Stadium features
Movable seating (4 sections of the lower tier can move 18 metres forward to give a rectangular configuration)
Two large internal video screens, one behind each goal (installed 2022); and two smaller internal video screens on opposite flanks of the field (original construction) – displaying scores, video replays and advertisements.
1000 video seats
13 function rooms
66 corporate boxes
Premium Club membership area, The Medallion Club
500 car parking spaces below the ground
Over 700 2000-watt lights for arena illumination
A varying capacity of between 12,000 and 74,000, depending on the event. For example, seats can be laid on the ground.
An AFL capacity of 53,359
Dimensions of playing area are 159.5 metres by 128.5 metres (174.4 yards by 140.5 yards)
The ends of the ground, where the AFL goal posts are located, are named after the two leading goalkickers in VFL/AFL history: the northern end is the Lockett End, after Tony Lockett; and the southern end is the Coventry End, after Gordon Coventry. Some clubs informally use alternative names during their home games in place of those to honour their own histories.

Usage

Australian rules football
As of 2021, five AFL teams have deals in place to play home games at Docklands Stadium:
 – ten home games per year. The club has played almost all home games at the venue since it opened in 2000.
 – nine home games per year. The club has played almost all home games at the venue since it opened in 2000.
 – seven home games per year. The venue has been the club's primary home ground since 2005, but it had previously played about five games per year from 2000 to 2004.
 – seven home games per year. The club has a 25-year deal, which has been in place since the stadium opened in 2000.
 – five or six home games per year under deals in place since 2005.

All Victorian-based AFL teams, including those not listed here, have played some home games at the ground during its history, owing to a contractual requirement between the AFL and the stadium's original owners to stage at least 46 AFL matches per year until 2013, and 40 matches per year thereafter.  and  both had deals to play around four home matches per year during the 2000s; and most other clubs still play one or two home matches there per year to make up the numbers.

In 2020, to mark 20 years of AFL football at the ground, the AFL named the 20 biggest moments and stories involving games played at the stadium in a video. The top 5 were as follows:

 Jason McCartney's AFL return after nearly dying in the 2002 Bali bombings – North Melbourne vs Richmond, Round 11 (6 June), 2003
 Lance Franklin completing a 100-goal season in 2008 – Hawthorn vs Carlton, Round 22 (30 August), 2008
 Wayne Carey's return to face North Melbourne after his extramarital scandal involving former teammate Anthony Stevens – North Melbourne vs Adelaide, Round 6 (2 May), 2003
 James Hird leading a final-quarter comeback with 15 touches and the winning goal – Essendon vs West Coast, Round 3 (10 April), 2004
 St Kilda and Geelong facing off after both clubs started the 2009 season 13-0, the latest meeting of unbeaten teams in a season – St Kilda vs Geelong, Round 14 (5 July), 2009

Cricket
The venue's major summer tenant is Big Bash League side Melbourne Renegades, which has played its home games at the Docklands Stadium since the league's inception in 2011/12. A drop-in pitch is used to facilitate cricket at the venue. At the end of the 2016/17 Big Bash, the stadium was rated the most entertaining venue for T20 cricket in Australia.

In 2016, Chris Gayle of the Renegades and the West Indies tied the record for the fastest T20 half century (12 balls) during the last round of BBL 5 at the ground against the Adelaide Strikers.

Although rare, multiple players have hit the roof during a game, which is 38 metres (125 feet) above the playing surface. For example, in 2018, Perth Scorchers batsman Ashton Turner hit a Dan Christian delivery into the roof; under the BBL rules, such a hit is considered to be six runs, with the ball being considered dead and unable to be caught for the purpose of getting the batsman out.

Soccer
The first time it was used for Soccer was in 2001 between South Melbourne and Melbourne Knights in the NSL. A-League team Melbourne Victory played home matches at the stadium between 2006/07 and 2020/21. Originally, the plan was that the stadium would only be used for games against its biggest rivals, Sydney FC, in the 2006/07 A-League; but after the success of that game, the club shifted permanently from Olympic Park Stadium to Docklands from the 2006/07 season until the 2009/10 season. This gave the stadium its first major summer tenant. After the opening of the Melbourne Rectangular Stadium in 2010, the club played only high-drawing games and finals at Docklands, with all other games being played at the new stadium; and as of the 2021-22 season, Victory ceased playing home matches at the stadium.

Rugby league
In the 2001 National Rugby League season, the stadium was the permanent home ground for the Melbourne Storm, but this deal lasted only one year. The club occasionally hosted high-drawing home games and finals at Docklands after that. In 2023, the Storm will play two games at the ground, as their regular home ground AAMI Park will be unavailable in July-August due to the 2023 FIFA Women's World Cup.

Docklands has also hosted interstate and international rugby league games. As Telstra Dome, Docklands hosted its first State of Origin game in 2006 as it hosted the deciding third game. New South Wales arrived looking for a win that would secure their fourth consecutive Origin victory and led 14–4 with 10 minutes to go, but Queensland scored two converted tries in the space of five minutes – first Brent Tate's long-range try after a line break from Johnathan Thurston and then Darren Lockyer intercepting a Brett Hodgson pass inside New South Wales' own half – to win 16-14 for the first of an eventual 8 consecutive Queensland victories.

As Etihad Stadium, the stadium also hosted Origin games in 2009 and 2012. The 2012 match attracted 56,021, a new record for rugby league at the stadium.

Others
The stadium has been converted to host several other sporting events. In its early years, the stadium was used for off-season one day international cricket matches, but has also held some summer matches, particularly in 2006 when the Melbourne Cricket Ground was unavailable due to preparations for the 2006 Commonwealth Games. The venue has also hosted international rugby union – including being Melbourne's venue during the 2003 Rugby World Cup – although the Melbourne Rectangular Stadium now hosts most such games.

Outside of sporting events, the stadium hosts special events and concerts. RMIT University uses the stadium as the site for its graduation ceremonies annually.

Records

Attendance

AFL records

Players
Most games played: Nick Riewoldt, 184
Most goals kicked: Nick Riewoldt, 452
Most goals kicked in a match: Mark LeCras, 12.2 (74), vs  17 July 2010
Most disposals in a match: Tom Rockliff, 48 vs , 4 June 2016; and Patrick Dangerfield, 48 vs , 11 June 2016
First AFL goal kicked: Michael Long, 9 March 2000

Teams
Highest winning percentage:  at 66.83% from 67 wins, 33 losses and one draw
Lowest winning percentage:  at 26.67% from 8 wins, 22 losses
Most wins:  with 151 wins, 6 draws and 121 losses at 55.40%
Highest score:  35.12 (222) defeated  9.11 (65), 6 May 2007
Lowest score:  2.9 (21) defeated by  11.18 (84), 9 July 2021
Highest margin:  (vs ), 157 points, 6 May 2007
Highest score in a quarter:  15.4 (94) vs.  0.1 (1), 1 May 2011

Last updated 3 March 2023.

International cricket
The following table summarises the ODI centuries scored at Docklands.

Concerts

Transport access
Docklands Stadium is serviced primarily by trains at Southern Cross Station, which is located on the City Loop and is serviced by all major metropolitan and country train and coach lines. The stadium is located on a public pedestrian concourse adjoining the northern end of the station.

The stadium is also serviced by several tram routes:
On Harbour Esplanade: Route 70, Route 75 and City Circle
On La Trobe St: Route 86, Route 30 and City Circle
The stadium also has a 500-vehicle carpark underneath the field which is accessible by the public for event days.

In popular culture
The venue appeared in the 2007 film Ghost Rider. Its name, wherever visible, was digitally changed to the SoBe Dome. It can also be seen in the video for Jessica Mauboy's single "Running Back", as well as some television shows, such as the Seven Network's City Homicide and Network Ten's Rush.

References

External links

Official website
Satellite photo of Docklands Stadium

Australian Football League grounds
Cricket grounds in Australia
Music venues in Melbourne
Rugby league stadiums in Australia
Rugby League World Cup stadiums
Rugby union stadiums in Australia
Rugby World Cup stadiums
Sports venues in Melbourne
Landmarks in Melbourne
Multi-purpose stadiums in Australia
2006 Commonwealth Games venues
Boxing venues in Australia
Sports venues completed in 2000
Event venues established in 2000
2000 establishments in Australia
Commonwealth Games rugby union venues
Retractable-roof stadiums in Australia
Melbourne Storm
A-League Men stadiums
A-League Women stadiums
Women's Big Bash League
AFL Women's grounds
Soccer venues in Melbourne
Sport in the City of Melbourne (LGA)
Buildings and structures in the City of Melbourne (LGA)